The Pacific Islands Rugby Alliance (PIRA) was set up in 2002 as a basis of co-operation between the Fiji, Samoa and Tonga Rugby Unions. Niue and the Cook Islands also became members of the Alliance and supplied players to the Pacific Islanders team.

References

External links 
 dhskx Islanders Rugby Teams supporters website

Pacific Islanders rugby union team
Rugby union in Fiji
Rugby union in Samoa
Rugby union in Tonga
Rugby union in the Cook Islands
Rugby union in Niue